Fatma Salman Kotan (born 1970) is a Turkish accountant, politician and Member of Parliament for Ağrı representing Justice and Development Party.

She is a graduate of economics from Atatürk University in Erzurum.

Speaking at the Turkish Women Entrepreneurs Association in August 2007 she gave her life story as follows:
My mother was my father's second wife. In our part of the world if a man is rich he will marry more than once. My mother died because of my father's pressure in her to have a son. I was the second child. The doctors told my mother it would be dangerous to have a third but my mother told us she had to make my father Sheikh Ahmet Salman happy, to continue his line by having a son. The doctors said it would be fatal to get pregnant but she didn't listen. Only a boy would make Sheikh Ahmet Salman happy. So my mother got pregnant for a third time and bore another girl. Two years later my mother died.

Ever since my childhood I have had it in my mind that not only a man can carry on the family of Sheikh Ahmet Salman, but a woman can too. That's why I was the first girl in my family to go to school. I went into politics and business. I knew that if I could make it i would be an inspiration to other women. By opening a brick factory in the area i showed that a woman could work in the dust and the mud. Now the number of women working in the area is increasing. (but) if we don't break down the patriarchy a little more Turkey will still be the same in 2007 as it was in 1970.

References

 

 

1970 births
People from Ağrı
Living people
Place of birth missing (living people)
Deputies of Ağrı
Justice and Development Party (Turkey) politicians
Turkish accountants
Members of the 24th Parliament of Turkey
21st-century Turkish women politicians